Ibrahima Khalil Kaba is a Guinean politician. He served as the Minister of Foreign Affairs from 29 January 2021 to 5 September 2021.

He was officially appointed on 19 January 2021 to become the next Minister of Foreign Affairs.

In March 2022, Ibrahima Khalil Kaba was arrested and taken to the High Command of the Gendarmerie. His arrest would be linked to the leak of an audio element in which former President Alpha Condé speaks, asking to prepare his party for the regaining power.

References 

Living people
Year of birth missing (living people)
Place of birth missing (living people)
Government ministers of Guinea
Foreign Ministers of Guinea
Louisiana Tech University alumni
21st-century Guinean people